Movement for Citizens' Commitment and Awakening (abbreviated MERCI) is a political party in Benin led by Séverin Adjovi.

In the 1999 parliamentary elections, MERCI elected two MPs: Amadou Assouma and Sacca Moussèdikou Fikara.

Political parties in Benin
Political parties with year of establishment missing